Trigger Street Productions is an American entertainment production company formed by Kevin Spacey in 1997 and further developed by his business partner Dana Brunetti. The company's credits include Captain Phillips, Shakespeare High, Safe, The Social Network, 21, Shrink, Fanboys, the Emmy-nominated Bernard and Doris, Emmy-winning Recount, Mini's First Time, Beyond the Sea, The United States of Leland, The Big Kahuna and House of Cards, as well as stage productions of The Iceman Cometh and Cobb.

Shortly after the company was formed, Trigger Street Productions had signed a deal with Fine Line Features in order to release films for a two-year period. In 2001, Trigger Street Productions was then signed to a contract with film financer Intermedia in order to finance future Trigger Street features, for a first-look deal, which resulted in the founder's involvement in producing K-PAX.

The name "Trigger Street" is a reference to an actual street in Spacey's boyhood home of Chatsworth, where Roy Rogers and Dale Evans (and Roy's horse Trigger) had their ranch. Spacey and his childhood friends dreamed of opening a neighborhood theater where they could stage their own "Trigger Street" productions. In 2011, the company signed a deal with Sony Pictures. In 2015, the company had launched a television division with a deal at Fox 21 Television Studios.

In January 2016 it was announced that Relativity Media, which was just emerging from Chapter 11 bankruptcy, had acquired Trigger Street Productions and that Spacey would become chairman of Relativity Studios whilst Brunetti would become the studio's president. Spacey called the move “an incredible opportunity to make great entertainment” and said he considered it the “next evolution in my career.”, and Brunetti said, "Being a disruptor at heart, I look forward to the opportunities that being inside a studio system will present."

However, when the paperwork for the studio was filed for the court it emerged that Spacey had opted out of assuming the chairmanship of the studios, and by the end of 2016 Brunetti had also left Relativity whilst both remained Executive Producers on House of Cards and Manhunt: Unabomber (previous working title: Manifesto).

Trigger Street Labs
Trigger Street Labs was developed by Dana Brunetti and launched in 2002 as an online community for unrepresented writers and filmmakers. In its first few years it had thousands of online users uploading their work, reviewing work by their peers, and participating in online competitions and short film festivals. The site was previously sponsored by Stella Artois, and in October 2009, Artois hosted the Stella Artois Short Film Project. The project was hosted on the site, and awarded the grand prize of US$50,000 to Jason Klein for his short film A Perfect Time.

Trigg.la
Trigg.la is a spin-off website from Trigger Street Labs. It hosts several podcasts, a filmmaking blog, and information about other Los Angeles-based industries.

Triggla podcasts
Triggla's podcasts, which are now off-air, were categorized under the headings of the arts, music, society and culture, and technology. In addition there was a podcast by the porn star Kayden Kross called Kayden's Review which reviewed mainstream films.

One of the podcasts, The First 15, was co-hosted by Carter Swan, vice president of Trigger Street Productions, and screenwriter Philip Eisner. The show featured a different would-be screenwriter each week who was interviewed via Skype and advised on how to make improvements to the first fifteen pages of their script. The screenplays originated from the Trigger Street Labs website.

Jameson First Shot
In 2011, the company teamed up with Jameson Irish Whiskey to create Jameson First Shot, which was an opportunity to give three up-and-coming filmmakers a 'first shot' in the movie business by producing their short film starring an A-List actor. In the competition's first year the actor was Kevin Spacey.  Each year the competition features a new actor and a new set of finalists to work with that actor. In the first years of the competition only one finalist was selected from each of these three territories: the United States, South Africa and Russia. In later years the competition was opened up to include more territories, but still only produced three winning scripts. The resulting films are debuted in a red carpet screening and screened online on Jameson's YouTube channel. The competition has run annually ever since its first year with a new set of winners and a new leading actor or actress.

2012 – Kevin Spacey Benjamin Leavitt, The Ventriloquist, USA
 Aleksey Nuzhny, Envelope, Russia
 Alan Shelley, Spirit of a Denture, South Africa2013 – Willem Dafoe Hanneke Schutte, Saving Norman, South Africa
 Anton Lanshakov, The Smile Man, Russia
 Shirlyn Wong, Love's Routine, USA2014 – Uma Thurman Henco J, The Mundane Goddess, South Africa
 Ivan Petukhov, The Gift, Russia
 Jessica Valentine, Jump, USA2015 – Adrien Brody Mark Middlewick, The Mascot, South Africa
 Travis Calvert, The Library Book, USA
 Stephan Tempier, Boredom, Canada2016 – Maggie Gyllenhaal Cameron Thrower, Beauty Mark, USA
 Kat Wood, Home, UK
 Jason Perini, The New Empress, Australia2017 – Dominic West' Filmography 
 Films 
 Gran Turismo (2023)
 Fifty Shades Freed (2018)
 Fifty Shades Darker (2017)
 Fifty Shades of Grey (2015)
 Captain Phillips (2013)
 The Ventriloquist (Jameson First Shot USA short)
 Envelope (Jameson First Shot Russian short)
 Spirit of a Denture (Jameson First Shot South African short)
 Safe (2012)
 Inseparable (2011)
 Margin Call (2010)
 Casino Jack (2010)
 The Social Network (2010)
 Father of Invention (2010)
 Shrink (2009)
 Fanboys (2008)
 Columbus Day (2008)
 21 (2008)
 Mini's First Time (2006)
 The Sasquatch Gang (2006)
 Edison (2005)
 Beyond the Sea (2004)
 TriggerStreet.com (2004)
 The United States of Leland (2003)
 Interstate 84 Ordinary Decent Criminal (2000)
 The Big Kahuna (1999)

 Direct-to-video and TV 
 Manhunt: Unabomber (2017, Discovery Channel)
 House of Cards (2013, Netflix Streaming)
 Bernard and Doris (2008, HBO)
 Recount (2008, HBO)
 Going Hollywood (2005)
 America Rebuilds: A Year at Ground Zero (2002)
 Uncle Frank'' (2002, HBO)

References

External links
 
 Jameson First Shot
 Trigger Street Labs

1997 establishments in California
2016 mergers and acquisitions
American companies established in 1997
Companies based in Los Angeles
Entertainment companies based in California
Film production companies of the United States
Kevin Spacey
Mass media companies established in 1997
Television production companies of the United States